Austwell is a city in northeastern Refugio County, Texas, United States. Its population was 147 at the 2010 census.

History
Austwell was laid out in 1911. The city's name is an amalgamation of Austin and McDowell, the names of its founders Preston R. Austin and Jesse C. McDowell.

Geography

Austwell is located at  (28.390413, –96.843555).

Austwell is bordered on the north by Hynes Bay, an extension of San Antonio Bay. It is less than 5 miles from the mouth of the Guadalupe River. 

Demographics

2010 census

At the 2010 census, there were 147 people in 71 households, including 47 families, in the city. There were 126 housing units. The racial makeup of the city was 98.6 percent White, 0.0 percent African American, 0.7 percent from other races, and 0.7 percent from two or more races. Hispanic or Latino of any race were 44.9 percent of the population.

Of the 71 households 11.3 percent had children under the age of 18 living with them, 56.3 percent were married couples living together, 5.6 percent had a female householder with no husband present, 4.2 percent had a male householder with no wife present, and 33.8 percent were non-families. 32.4 percent of all households were made up of individuals, and 18.3 percent had someone living alone who was 65 or older. The average household size was 2.07 and the average family size was 2.57.

The age distribution was 10.9 percent under the age of 18, 12.1 percent under 20, 10.9 percent from 20 to 29, 6.1 percent from 30 to 39, 7.5 percent from 40 to 49, 20.4 percent from 50 to 59, 11.6 percent from 60 to 64, and 31.3 percent who were 65 or older. The median age was 58.3 years. For every 100 females, there were 96.0 males. For every 100 females age 18 and over, there were 89.9 males.

2000 census
At the 2000 census there were 192 people in 88 households, including 60 families, in the city. The population density was 527.5 people per square mile (205.9/km2). There were 134 housing units at an average density of 368.1 per square mile (143.7/km2).  The racial makeup of the city was 91.67% White, 1.56% African American, 6.77% from other races. Hispanic or Latino of any race were 57.29%.

Of the 88 households 21.6% had children under the age of 18 living with them, 55.7% were married couples living together, 11.4% had a female householder with no husband present, and 31.8% were non-families. 30.7% of households were one person and 14.8% were one person aged 65 or older. The average household size was 2.18 and the average family size was 2.72.

The age distribution was 19.3% under the age of 18, 4.7% from 18 to 24, 21.4% from 25 to 44, 30.7% from 45 to 64, and 24.0% 65 or older. The median age was 49 years. For every 100 females, there were 97.9 males. For every 100 females age 18 and over, there were 98.7 males.

The median household income was $23,750 and the median family income  was $20,000. Males had a median income of $37,917 versus $21,250 for females. The per capita income for the city was $19,146. About 32.0% of families and 33.5% of the population were below the poverty line, including 44.4% of those under the age of eighteen and 33.3% of those sixty five or over.

Climate
The climate in this area is characterized by hot, humid summers and generally mild to cool winters.  According to the Köppen Climate Classification system, Austwell has a humid subtropical climate, abbreviated "Cfa" on climate maps.

References

External links 
 Article "Austwell" in Handbook of Texas online

Cities in Texas
Cities in Refugio County, Texas
Populated coastal places in Texas